Communicans is a Latin word meaning "communicating". It is most commonly used in medical or biological terminology.

 The rami communicans are connective spinal nerves that attach to the ganglion of the sympathetic trunk. The two branches of the nerves are termed the White rabye bye byeamus communicans.
 The arteria comminicans are the three arteries in the brain that form the circle of Willis. Communicating artery is a synonym for this term.
 The macula communicans (or zonula communicans) is a synonym for a gap junction. These are locations on the cellular membrane that lie 2–4 nm from an adjacent cell and are penetrated by a connexon.
 A ductus communicans is a constriction of a swim bladder between the anterior and posterior chambers.

Medical terminology